Almahdi Ali Mukhtar is a Qatari footballer who plays as a defender for Al-Gharafa SC and Qatar national football team. He became the sixth Aspire Academy graduate to play for Qatar's senior national team after he made his debut in a friendly match against Egypt on 28 December 2010.

Prior to joining Al-Gharafa SC, Almahdi played as a defender for Al Sadd SC. In 2015, Almahdi was officially signed by Al-Gharafa SC and continues to play as a defender.

International career

International goals
Scores and results list Qatar's goal tally first.

References 

Living people
1992 births
Qatari footballers
Qatar international footballers
Al Sadd SC players
Al-Gharafa SC players
2015 AFC Asian Cup players
People from Doha
Association football defenders
Footballers at the 2010 Asian Games
Aspire Academy (Qatar) players
Qatar Stars League players
Asian Games competitors for Qatar